The West Scotia Basin is a submarine basin in the South Atlantic Ocean, near its border with the Southern Ocean. The basin is found southeast of Tierra del Fuego, south of the Falkland Islands, and northeast of the Antarctic Peninsula. It forms the western portion of the Scotia Plate.

Plate tectonics
Oceanic basins of the Atlantic Ocean